Angel Light may refer to:
Angel Light (novel), a 1995 novel
Angel Light, a device invented by Troy Hurtubise which can purportedly render objects transparent
Angel-lights, an architectural term